1208 Troilus  is a large and notably inclined Jupiter trojan from the Trojan camp, approximately  in diameter. It was discovered on 31 December 1931, by German astronomer Karl Reinmuth at the Heidelberg Observatory in southern Germany. The unusual F-type asteroid belongs to the largest Jupiter trojans and has a long rotation period of 56.2 hours. It was named after the Trojan prince Troilus, who was killed by Achilles.

Orbit and classification 

Troilus is a dark Jovian asteroid orbiting in the trailing Trojan camp at Jupiter's  Lagrangian point, 60° behind its orbit in a 1:1 resonance . It is also a non-family asteroid of the Jovian background population.

It orbits the Sun at a distance of 4.8–5.7 AU once every 12 years (4,395 days; semi-major axis of 5.25 AU). Its orbit has an eccentricity of 0.09 and a high inclination of 34° with respect to the ecliptic. The body's observation arc begins with its official discovery observation at Heidelberg in December 1931.

Physical characteristics 

In the Tholen classification, Troilus has an ambiguous and unusual spectrum, closest to that of an F-type and somewhat similar to a common C-type asteroid (FCU). It has also been characterized as a carbonaceous C-type in the Barucci taxonomy (C0-type).

Rotation period 

In April 2007, a rotational lightcurve of Troilus was obtained from photometric observations by Lawrence Molnar at the Calvin-Rehoboth Robotic Observatory  in New Mexico. Lightcurve analysis gave a rotation period of  hours with a brightness variation of  magnitude. While not being a slow rotator, Troilus has a significantly longer period than most asteroids, and one of longest of all larger Jupiter trojans.

The period also supersedes previous observations made by Linda French with the 0.9-meter SMARTS telescope at Cerro Tololo in the 1980s and by Federico Manzini at the Sozzago Astronomical Station , which gave a period of 24 and 63.8 hours, respectively.

Diameter and albedo 

According to the surveys carried out by the Infrared Astronomical Satellite IRAS, the Japanese Akari satellite and the NEOWISE mission of NASA's Wide-field Infrared Survey Explorer, Troilus measures between 100.48 and 111.36 kilometers in diameter and its surface has an albedo between 0.037 and 0.0419. The Collaborative Asteroid Lightcurve Link derives an albedo of 0.0397 and a diameter of 103.31 kilometers based on an absolute magnitude of 9.05.

Naming 

This minor planet was named from Greek mythology after the young Trojan prince Troilus, the son of King Priam (also see 884 Priamus), who in a medieval legend loved Cressida (see 548 Kressida) and lost her to Diomedes (see 1437 Diomedes). Troilus was killed by Achilles (see 588 Achilles) in the Trojan War. The official naming citation was published by Paul Herget in The Names of the Minor Planets in 1955.

References

External links 
 Asteroid Lightcurve Database (LCDB), query form (info )
 Dictionary of Minor Planet Names, Google books
 Asteroids and comets rotation curves, CdR – Observatoire de Genève, Raoul Behrend
 Discovery Circumstances: Numbered Minor Planets (1)-(5000)  – Minor Planet Center
 
 
 

001208
Discoveries by Karl Wilhelm Reinmuth
Named minor planets
001208
19311231